John Dominis Holt may refer to:

John Dominis Holt II (1861-1915), Hawaiian colonel and Democratic delegate
John Dominis Holt IV (1919-1993), Hawaiian writer and cultural historian